was a Japanese politician who served as Prime Minister from 1964 to 1972. He is the third-longest serving Prime Minister, and ranks second in longest uninterrupted service as Prime Minister.

Satō entered the National Diet in 1949 as a member of the Liberal Party. Gradually rising through the ranks of Japanese politics, he held a series of cabinet positions. In 1964 he succeeded Hayato Ikeda as Prime Minister, becoming the first Prime Minister to have been born in the 20th century.

As Prime Minister, Satō presided over a period of rapid economic growth. He arranged for the formal return of Okinawa (Ryukyu Islands; occupied by the United States since the end of the Second World War) to Japanese control. Satō brought Japan into the Nuclear Non-Proliferation Treaty, for which he received the Nobel Peace Prize as a co-recipient in 1974.

Early life

Satō was born on 27 March 1901, in Tabuse, Yamaguchi Prefecture, the third son of businessman Hidesuke Satō and his wife Moyo. His father had worked in the Yamaguchi Prefectural Office, but quit in 1898, and started a sake brewing business in Kishida, Tabuse. The family had a history in sake brewing and had held the right for sake brewing for generations. Sato's great-grandfather was a samurai of the Chōshū Domain, with their outsized influence in Meiji era Japan, with more Meiji and Taisho prime ministers coming from Yamaguchi than any other prefecture. His older brothers, Ichiro Sato, would become a rear admiral, and Nobusuke Kishi, a prime minister from 1957-1960.

Satō studied German law at Tokyo Imperial University and in 1923, passed the senior civil service examinations. Upon graduation the following year, he became a civil servant in the Ministry of Railways. He served as Director of the Osaka Railways Bureau from 1944 to 1946 and Vice-Minister for Transport from 1947 to 1948.

Satō entered the Diet in 1949 as a member of the Liberal Party.

He served as Minister of Postal Services and Telecommunications from July 1951 to July 1952. Sato gradually rose through the ranks of Japanese politics, becoming chief cabinet secretary to then prime minister Shigeru Yoshida from January 1953 to July 1954. He later served as minister of construction from October 1952 to February 1953.

After the Liberal Party merged with the Japan Democratic Party to form the Liberal Democratic Party, Satō served as chairman of the party executive council from December 1957 to June 1958, followed by a post as minister of finance in the cabinet of his brother Nobusuke Kishi from 1958-1960. As minister of finance, Sato requested the US to fund conservatives. 

Satō also served in the cabinets of Kishi's successor as prime minister, Hayato Ikeda. From July 1961 to July 1962, Satō was Minister of International Trade and Industry. From July 1963 to June 1964 he was concurrently head of the Hokkaidō Development Agency and of the Science and Technology Agency.

Prime minister

Satō succeeded Ikeda after the latter resigned due to ill health. His government was longer than many, and by the late 1960s he appeared to have single-handed control over the entire Japanese government. He was a popular prime minister due to the growing economy; his foreign policy, which was a balancing act between the interests of the United States and China, was more tenuous. Student political radicalization led to numerous protests against Satō's support of the United States–Japan Security Treaty, and Japanese tacit support for American military operations in Vietnam. These protests expanded into massive riots, which eventually forced Satō to close the prestigious University of Tokyo for a year in 1969.

After three terms as prime minister, Satō decided not to run for a fourth. His heir apparent, Takeo Fukuda, won the Sato faction's support in the subsequent Diet elections, but the more popular MITI minister, Kakuei Tanaka, won the vote, ending the Satō faction's dominance.

Relations with China and Taiwan
Satō is the last Prime minister of Japan to visit Taiwan during his term. In 1965, Satō approved a US$150 million loan to Taiwan. He visited Taipei in September 1967. In 1969, Satō insisted that the defense of Taiwan was necessary for the safety of Japan. Satō followed the United States in most major issues, but Satō opposed the Nixon visit to China. Satō also bitterly opposed the entry of the PRC into the United Nations in 1971.

Nuclear affairs
In the 1960s Sato argued that Japan needed nuclear weapons to match those of China, but the United States opposed such.  The Johnson administration pressed Japan to sign the Nuclear Non-Proliferation Treaty, ending, for then, Japan's nuclear ambitions.

Satō introduced the Three Non-Nuclear Principles on 11 December 1967, which means non-production, non-possession, and non-introduction of nuclear weapons. He later suggested the "Four-Pillars Nuclear Policy". During the prime ministership of Satō, Japan entered the Nuclear Non-Proliferation Treaty. The Diet passed a resolution formally adopting the principles in 1971. For this he received the Nobel Peace Prize in 1974.

However, recent inquiries show that behind the scenes, Satō was more accommodating towards US plans of stationing nuclear weapons on Japanese soil. In December 2008, the Japanese government declassified a document showing that during a visit to the US in January 1965, he was discussing with US officials the possibility of using nuclear weapons against the People's Republic of China. In December 2009, his son reported that his father agreed in a November 1969 conversation with US President Nixon to allow the stationing of nuclear warheads in Okinawa once it was restored to Japanese sovereignty.

Okinawa issues
Since the end of the Second World War, Okinawa had been occupied by the United States. While visiting the United States in January 1965, Satō openly asked President Lyndon Johnson to return Okinawa to Japan. In August 1965, Satō became the first post-war prime minister of Japan to visit Okinawa.

In 1969, Satō struck a deal with U.S. president Richard Nixon to repatriate Okinawa and remove its nuclear weaponry: this deal was controversial because it allowed the U.S. forces in Japan to maintain bases in Okinawa after repatriation. Okinawa was formally returned to Japan on 15 May 1972, which also included the Senkaku Islands (also known as the Diaoyu Islands in China and the subject, since 1971, of a Sino-Japanese sovereignty dispute; see Senkaku Islands dispute).

Relations with Southeast Asia
During Satō's term, Japan participated in the creation of the Asian Development Bank in 1966 and held a ministerial level conference on Southeast Asian economic development. It was the first international conference sponsored by the Japanese government in the postwar period. In 1967, he was also the first Japanese prime minister to visit Singapore. He was largely supportive of the South Vietnamese government throughout the Vietnam War.

Later life
Satō shared the Nobel Peace Prize with Seán MacBride in 1974. He was awarded for representing the Japanese people's will for peace, and for signing the nuclear arms Non-Proliferation Treaty in 1970. He was the first Asian to accept the Nobel Peace Prize. (In 1973, Vietnamese politician Le Duc Tho had become the first Asian to win the prize, but Tho had rejected it.)

Death
While at a restaurant on 19 May 1975, Satō suffered a massive stroke, resulting in a coma. He died at 12:55 a.m. on 3 June at the Jikei University Medical Center, aged 74. After a public funeral, his ashes were buried in the family cemetery at Tabuse.

Satō was posthumously honored with the Collar of the Order of the Chrysanthemum, the highest honor in the Japanese honors system.

Personal life

Satō married  in 1926 and had two sons, Ryūtarō and Shinji. Hiroko's father, Matsusuke Satō, was Eisaku's paternal uncle. After Matsusuke died in 1911, Hiroko was raised by her maternal uncle, diplomat Yōsuke Matsuoka. Their son Shinji followed his father into politics, serving in both houses and as a cabinet minister. Shinji's son-in-law, Masashi Adachi, currently serves in the House of Councillors, and formerly worked as an aide for his cousin-in-law, Eisaku's grandnephew, Shinzo Abe.

In a 1969 Shukan Asahi interview with novelist Shūsaku Endō, Hiroko accused him of being a rake and a wife-beater. His hobbies included golf, fishing, and the Japanese tea ceremony. Nobusuke Kishi (his older brother) and Shinzō Abe (his grandnephew) were also both former prime ministers.

Honours
Satō received the following awards:
Golden Pheasant Award of the Scout Association of Japan (1970)
Grand Cordon of the Order of the Chrysanthemum (3 November 1972)
Nobel Peace Prize (12 May 1974)
Collar of the Order of the Chrysanthemum (3 June 1975; posthumous)
Junior First Rank (3 June 1975)

Foreign honours
  Spain: Knight Grand Cross of the Order of Isabella the Catholic (23 February 1965)
 : Honorary Grand Commander of the Order of the Defender of the Realm (S.M.N.) (1967)
 : The Order of Temasek (25 September 1967)
 : Sash of the Order of the Aztec Eagle (9 March 1972)
 : Grand Cross of National Order of Merit (5 April 1972)
 : Order of Diplomatic Service Merit (1969)
 : Order of the Million Elephants and the White Parasol (1966)

See also
 List of Japanese Nobel laureates
 List of Nobel laureates affiliated with the University of Tokyo

References

Further reading
 Dufourmont, Eddy (2008). "Satō Eisaku, Yasuoka Masahiro and the Re-Establishment of 11 February as National Day: the Political Use of National Memory in Postwar Japan". In Wolfgang Schwentker and Sven Saaler ed., The Power of Memory in Modern Japan, Brill, pp. 204–222. 
 Edström Bert (1999). Japan's Evolving Foreign Policy Doctrine: From Yoshida to Miyazawa. Palgrave Macmillan. Chapter 5: "The Cautious and Discreet Prime Minister: Satō Eisaku". 
 Hattori, Ryuji (2020). Eisaku Sato, Japanese Prime Minister, 1964-72: Okinawa, Foreign Relations, Domestic Politics and the Nobel Prize. Routledge. 
 Hoey, Fintan (2015). Satō, America and the Cold War: US-Japanese Relations, 1964–72. Palgrave Macmillan. 
 Kapur, Nick (2018). "The Empire Strikes Back? The 1968 Meiji Centennial Celebrations and the Revival of Japanese Nationalism". Japanese Studies 38:3. pp. 305–328.
 Tsuda, Taro (2019). Satō Eisaku and the Establishment of Single-Party Rule in Postwar Japan. PhD dissertation. Harvard University.

External links

 Film Footage of Eisaku Sato's State Visit to Washington DC
  including the Nobel Lecture 11 December 1974 ''The Pursuit of Peace and Japan in the Nuclear Ageää
 Satō Eisaku EB article
 Japanese government home page
 Brief summary of the debate around Eiskau Sato's Nobel Prize at OpenLearn 

|-

|-

|-

|-

|-

|-

|-

|-

|-

1901 births
1975 deaths
20th-century prime ministers of Japan
Prime Ministers of Japan
Japanese Nobel laureates
Nobel Peace Prize laureates
Ministers of Construction of Japan
Ministers of Finance of Japan
Members of the House of Representatives (Japan)
Japanese anti-communists
Liberal Democratic Party (Japan) politicians
Liberal Party (Japan, 1945) politicians
University of Tokyo alumni
Knights Grand Cross of the Order of Isabella the Catholic
20th-century Japanese politicians
Recipients of the Darjah Utama Temasek
Japanese diarists
Tabuse, Yamaguchi
Politicians from Yamaguchi Prefecture
20th-century diarists